Hemza Mihoubi (born January 13, 1986) is an Algerian-French footballer who currently plays for FC Locarno.

Club career 
Mihoubi started his professional career at FC Metz, where he came up through the club's youth system. After a season with the first team, he joined the Italian club U.S. Lecce. He was loaned out to Belgian club SC Charleroi, but failed to make an impact there and returned to US Lecce, where he now plays regular football. On 28 July 2009, AC Bellinzona signed the French-Algerian left-back from US Lecce on a two-year deal.

International career 
Mihoubi started his international career for the Algerian Under 18 team, earning two caps at this level. However, taking advantage of FIFA regulations, he switched allegiances and played for the French Under 19 team, where he got five caps. He played at 2005 UEFA European Under-19 Football Championship qualifying round. He is the first known Algerian player to make this switch, with most players doing the reverse.

External links 
 Hemza Mihoubi Stats With The French Junior National Team
 
 
 football.ch

1986 births
Living people
Algerian footballers
French footballers
France youth international footballers
FC Metz players
R. Charleroi S.C. players
U.S. Lecce players
AC Bellinzona players
FC Wohlen players
Ligue 1 players
Serie B players
Belgian Pro League players
Expatriate footballers in France
Expatriate footballers in Italy
Expatriate footballers in Belgium
Expatriate footballers in Switzerland
French expatriate footballers
Algerian expatriates in Belgium
Association football defenders
French sportspeople of Algerian descent
Footballers from Oran
Algerian expatriate sportspeople in Switzerland